Robinsonia deiopea is a moth in the family Erebidae. It was described by Herbert Druce in 1895. It is found in Belize and Costa Rica.

References

Moths described in 1895
Robinsonia (moth)
Arctiinae of South America